Midway Plantation may refer to:

Midway Plantation House and Outbuildings, listed on the National Register of Historic Places in Wake County, North Carolina
Midway Plantation (Fort Motte, South Carolina), listed on the National Register of Historic Places in Calhoun County, South Carolina